Letters from the Devil: The Lost Writing of Anton Szandor LaVey is a volume composed of over 60 tabloid newspaper articles written by Anton LaVey, the founder of the Church of Satan.

References

Church of Satan
2010 non-fiction books
Works by Anton LaVey